The 1981 Cork Intermediate Hurling Championship was the 72nd staging of the Cork Intermediate Hurling Championship since its establishment by the Cork County Board in 1909. The draw for the opening round fixtures took place on 25 January 1981. The championship ran from 29 May to 30 August 1981.

The final was played on 30 August 1981 at Bishop Casey Memorial Park in Mallow, between Newtownshandrum and Cloughduv, in what was their first ever meeting in the final. Newtownshandrum won the match by 3-12 to 1-10 to claim their third championship title overall and a first title in five years.

On 30 August 1981, Newtownshandrum won the championship following a 3-12 to 1-10 defeat of Cloughduv in the final at Bishop Casey Memorial Park. This was their third championship title overall and their first title since 1976.

Cloughduv's Connie Kelly was the championship's top scorer with 2-33.

Team changes

To Championship

Promoted from the Cork Junior Hurling Championship
 Newcestown

From Championship

Promoted to the Cork Senior Hurling Championship
 Ballyhea

Regrdaed to the East Cork Junior A Hurling Championship
 Watergrasshill

Results

First round

Second round

Quarter-finals

Semi-finals

Final

Championship statistics

Top scorers

Top scorers overall

References

Cork Intermediate Hurling Championship
Cork Intermediate Hurling Championship